Julius' Castle is a castle-shaped building that sits at 1541 Montgomery Street on Telegraph Hill in San Francisco. It served as a visual landmark and as a restaurant for many years, originally opening between 1924 and 1928. Since 1980, the building has been listed as a San Francisco Landmark Number 121. The architecture is described by the San Francisco Planning Department as, "primarily derived from the Gothic Revival and Arts & Crafts Styles".

History
In 1886, the lot originally housed Michael Crowley’s two-story grocery store and later it was replaced with a family home which burned down in a fire in 1917. In 1923, Julius Roz (1869–1947) started the construction process with architect Luigi "Louis" Mastropasqua (1870–1951). The design of Julius' Castle was to pay tribute to Layman's Wooden Castle (also known as Layman’s Folly) a former German-style castle building that was a tourist attraction on Telegraph Hill from 1882 to 1903. Both Roz and Mastropasqua had emigrated from Italy to San Francisco a year prior to the closing of Layman's Folly. The Panama–Pacific International Exposition demolition in 1919 provided salvaged redwood and maple for the construction of Julius' Castle. In the 1920s the castle was painted pink. It operated as a speakeasy for a time during Prohibition.

Julius' Castle stayed open after Roz died in 1947. The interior was decorated in Victorian-era parlor style with views of the San Francisco Bay. It was very popular with celebrities, politicians and businessmen such as Robert Redford, Cary Grant, Sean Connery, Marlon Brando, Ginger Rogers, Sir Edmund Hillary, and the entire cast of the film The Empire Strikes Back. Julius' Castle makes appearances in Dashiell Hamett's novels. The 1951 film, The House on Telegraph Hill was filmed at Julius' Castle.

After being operated by a series of restaurant owners and managers (some reportedly more competent than others), Julius' Castle closed in 2007. In 2017, the City approved the reopening of the eatery. However due to the neighbors complaints of a fear of crowds and noise and a related lawsuit, there were delays in reopening, and it's now scheduled to reopen in 2023.

Gallery

See also 
 List of San Francisco Designated Landmarks

References

External links
 Julius' Castle website
 Video: "Julius Castle on Telegraph Hill – This Forgotten Day in S.F." from San Francisco Chronicle (2015) 

San Francisco Designated Landmarks
1880s architecture in the United States
Drinking establishments in the San Francisco Bay Area
Restaurants in the San Francisco Bay Area
Speakeasies
Nightclubs in San Francisco